Dunwich is an Italian symphonic/gothic metal band founded in Rome in 1985. Dunwich were among the first to use a female vocalist and symphonic music elements, especially brass instrument. Rockeramagazine considers them forerunners of the modern symphonic metal, defining them as the "first symphonic metal band".

History

The name 
The project was founded in 1985 by Claudio Nigris a multi-instrumentalist. At the time he was twenty years old. The inspiration for Dunwich comes from:
The Lovecraftian world, the band first demo tape of 1985 was The Dunwich Horror like the short story of the same name.
The city of Dunwich in Suffolk disappeared due storms and coastal erosion between 1287 and 1328.

The 80s 
The first period of Dunwich projects lasts until 1992, with the productions of fours demo tapes, inspired mainly from Lovecraftian works. The first three demos has also the titles borrowed from Lovecraft's stories: The Dunwich Horror (1985), Horror at Red Hook (1988) and Morbid dance tale of Yog-Sothoth (1989). 
At that time the band lineup had only two fixed members: Claudio Nigris and Alessandro Vitanza at drums. Among other members in that period also Andy Menario, later in Martira.
In 1991 Dunwich was on Main Stage at Arezzo Wave in 1991, they were also broadcast on VideoMusic, the Italian music television between '80s and '90s.
The first period of Dunwich productions end in the same year with the demo tape On the way back. Elements of inspirations are not  only Lovercraft's stories, but they begin to include also legends and other references.

The 90s 
Crucial in developing Dunwich sound is the encounter with the singer Katya Sanna, who joined the project in 1992, remaining there until 1999.
The elements of Dunwich inspiration becomes medieval and gothic literary elements, but also research on fairy tales and legends from around the world.  The first production is divided into three demo tapes, Il tavolo di smeraldo (1992), Sul monte è il tuono and Sopra il lago il vento, both of 1993. 
In these demos appear all the elements that build the symphonic sound of Duwnich: brass, quintets, orchestras and medieval polyphonic choirs. The debut album, Sul monte il tuono (On the mountain, the thunder), which takes its title from the same demo, is published by Black Widow in 1994, receiving a great response to critics. Following in the 1995 the second album Il chiarore sorge due volte (Flare rises twice) for the Pick-Up Records.
In this album came out the band attentions to the sounds of the new wave gothic. In 1998, with the German label Rising Sun Records, is published Eternal eclipse of frost, which accentuates the metal sound. This album allows Dunwich to project ind the international scene. Echoes the style of the album can be found, according to the journalist Eduardo Vitolo, the album Sirius B of Therion 's 2004.

2000s 
The experience of the project Dunwich continues in 2004 with a new line-up.: the new singer Francesca Naccarelli, Roberto Fasciani, bass, Luca Iovenio, drums. The fourth studio album is, in 2008, Heilagmanoth
Since this production, they started also some collaborations. 
In 2009 Francesca Naccarelli is, with Damian Wilson and Zachary Stevens among the voices chosen for The Akallabêth, a project from Italian keyboard player Archangel. This concept album based on the fourth part of Silmarillion combines elements of progressive and hard rock.
In 2010, Dunwich compose The Oblong box a song for a multi-band project The Tales of Edgar Allan Poe – A Synphonic Collection produced by Finnish magazine Colossus with French label Musea.
 
In 2012, for Italian progressive group Karnya, Claudio Nigris made some violins arrangements and the singer Francesca Naccarelli is guest in a song.

Discography

Studio albums 
1994 – Sul monte il tuono
1995 – Il chiarore sorge due volte
1998 – Eternal eclipse of frost
2008 – Heilagmanoth

Other projects 
2013 – The Oblong box in The Tales of Edgar Allan Poe – A collection Synphonic

References

Bibliography 
  
 
 
 

Italian gothic metal musical groups
Italian progressive metal musical groups
Italian symphonic metal musical groups
Musical groups established in 1985
1985 establishments in Italy